Eternal Tears of Sorrow (commonly abbreviated to EToS) is a Finnish symphonic/melodic death metal band formed in Pudasjärvi.

Biography 
The band was formed in 1994 by Jarmo Puolakanaho, Altti Veteläinen and Olli-Pekka Törrö, after various projects that featured people who became members of  Eternal Tears of Sorrow. Andromeda, a first death/doom/thrash metal project, had been put on hold in late 1992 because the rehearsal place had burned down. They could not find a new rehearsal place in their hometown, so the three members started a new side-project (M.D.C.) and recorded a demo tape, Beyond The Fantasy in autumn 1993.

In spring 1994, they recorded a new demo, The Seven Goddesses of Frost. Then the band decided to change their name to something they felt more appropriate opting for Eternal Tears of Sorrow. Between 1994 and 1996 the band had a couple of songs on some compilation CDs in Europe and Canada, and recorded their debut, Sinner's Serenade.  It took more than a year for the debut album to get released by X-Treme Records, a small underground label from Gothenburg in Sweden. After they recorded their second album, Vilda Mánnu, Spinefarm Records approached the band and soon they signed a deal with the label.

Their third album, Chaotic Beauty (on which the band had three new members since Olli-Pekka Törrö had left the band), led to a European tour with Nightwish and Sinergy. Their fourth album, A Virgin and a Whore, went to the Finnish Album Top 40 charts. After releasing four albums, the band announced they were taking a break just after the release of A Virgin and a Whore; however, they broke up in January 2003.

In February 2005, the band announced they were going to make a comeback. Their fifth album, Before the Bleeding Sun, was released in April 2006 (excluding releases in Russia and Japan that were released later). This album also went to the Finnish Album Top 40 charts, to No. 26. The band added two session members since Petri Sankala and Janne Tolsa were unavailable at that time.

In late 2008, the band announced that Jarmo Kylmänen (who had been part of the band's song-writing team since 2005) had joined the band as an official member. Soon after that, their long-time drummer Petri Sankala left because of back pain. In early April 2009, it was reported that Risto Ruuth had left the band. They found a replacement, Mika Lammassaari, and started rehearsing for the postponed live shows originally planned for May.

The band's sixth album, Children of the Dark Waters, came out in May 2009 through Suomen Musiikki in Finland, Massacre Records in the rest of Europe, and Marquee/Avalon in Asia. A new single, "Tears of Autumn Rain," was released in Finland and Japan as well as on the band's MySpace page. The other track on the single was a re-recorded version of "Vilda Mánnu" from their second album. Children of the Dark Waters charted at No. 19 at the Finnish Album Top 40 charts.

The seventh album, Saivon Lapsi, was released in February 2013.

Mika Lammassaari left the band in 2018 and Risto Ruuth joined the band again. Currently, the band is writing new material.

Discography

Full-length albums 
 Sinner's Serenade (1997)
 Vilda Mánnu (1998)
 Chaotic Beauty (2000)
 A Virgin and a Whore (2001)
 Before the Bleeding Sun (2006)
 Children of the Dark Waters (2009)
 Saivon Lapsi (2013)

Singles 
 Sacrament of Wilderness (split single with Nightwish and Darkwoods My Betrothed) (1998)
 The Last One for Life (Finland only) (2001)
 Tears of Autumn Rain (2009)
 Dark Alliance (2013)

Band members

Timeline

Current members 
 Altti Veteläinen – vocals, bass, 1994–present
 Jarmo Kylmänen – clean vocals, 2008–present
 Jarmo Puolakanaho – guitar, 1994–present
 Risto Ruuth – guitar, 2005–2009, 2018–present
 Janne Tolsa – keyboards, 2005–present
 Juho Raappana – drums, 2008–present

Former members 
 Olli-Pekka Törrö – guitar, 1994–1999 (For My Pain..., also in all the previous pre-EToS projects)
 Pasi Hiltula – keyboards, 1999–2003 (Kalmah, Scenery Channel, Burning Point), session tour musician 2009–2010
 Antti-Matti Talala – guitar, 1999–2000 (To/Die/For, Soulrelic, Kalmah)
 Antti Kokko – guitar 2000–2003, bass as a session tour musician 1997–1998 (Kalmah)
 Petri Sankala – drums 1999–2008, session tour musician 1997–1998 (For My Pain..., Kalmah, also in Andromeda 1992–93)
 Mika Lammassaari – guitar, 2009–2018, (Wolfheart, Mors Subita)

Guest musicians on albums 
 Heli Luokkala – guest vocals on Vilda Mánnu
 Kimberly Goss – guest vocals on Chaotic Beauty (Sinergy, Therion)
 Juha Kylmänen – guest vocals on A Virgin and a Whore (For My Pain..., Reflexion)
 Miriam Elisabeth Renvåg – guest vocals on Before the Bleeding Sun, Children of the Dark Waters and Saivon Lapsi (Ram-Zet, For My Pain...)
 Tony Kakko – guest vocals on Before the Bleeding Sun (Sonata Arctica)
 Marko Hietala – guest vocals on Before the Bleeding Sun (Tarot, Nightwish, Sinergy)
 Heidi Parviainen – guest vocals on Children of the Dark Waters (Amberian Dawn)

Session tour musicians 
 Pekka Kokko – bass guitar, 1999 (Kalmah)
 Heidi Määttä – keyboards, 2000 (Embraze, The Man-Eating Tree), temporarily replacing Pasi Hiltula.
 Juha Kylmänen – clean vocals, 2001 (For My Pain..., Reflexion, To/Die/For)
 Veli-Matti Kananen – keyboards, 2006–2007, 2010 (Tacere), temporarily replacing Janne Tolsa
 Tuomo Laikari – drums, 2006–2007, temporarily replacing Petri Sankala

References

External links

Finnish melodic death metal musical groups
Musical groups established in 1994
Musical groups disestablished in 2001
Musical groups reestablished in 2005
Finnish symphonic metal musical groups
Massacre Records artists
1994 establishments in Finland